The United States Environmental Protection Agency (EPA) defines brownfield land as property where the reuse may be complicated by the presence of hazardous materials. Brownfields can be abandoned gas stations, dry cleaning establishments, factories, mills, or foundries.

Issues

Progress on brownfields restoration 
Because of the growing considerations and acceptance of both federal and state agencies, more and more underused and abandoned properties are being redeveloped. 
 1994, the Clinton Administration approved the Brownfields Tax Incentive to Speed Urban Cleanup, Redevelopment.
 1997, the Clinton Administration announced its Brownfields National Partnership.
 1997, Congress approved the Balanced Budget Act.
 2002, the Bush Administration approved the Brownfield Revitalization and Environmental Restoration Act.
 2009, the United States Department of Housing and Urban Development (HUD) issued a revised contamination policy for HUD-assisted multi-family housing projects.
 2009, brownfield redevelopment claims part of the EPA Report on Fighting Climate Change.

Cost 
One of the major concerns with Brownfield development is the cost of cleaning up the area. However, with the passing of the Small Business Liability Relief and Brownfields Revitalization Act, there are now funds available from the Federal Government to help in the cost of cleaning.

Another option for assistance is the Brownfields Tax Incentive program, which was signed into law in 1997 and extends through December 31, 2011. The tax incentives goal is to encourage the cleanup and reuse of brownfields and the environmental cleanup costs are fully deductible in the year incurred. To qualify for this incentive the property must be owned by the taxpayer incurring the cost and there must be hazardous materials on the site.

Other federal grants and programs insist of providing either funding or technical assistance in assessing, cleaning, and revitalization of brownfields.

There are also low interest loans and grants offered by states to help in the cost of cleanup if the property meets the eligibility requirements.

Liability and risk 
Liability issues are of extreme importance to brownfield remediation. Foremost, developers run the risk of being held accountable for future remediation efforts if EPA or the state imposes additional requirements. Private parties must consider whether and when public groups should participate in control-site decisions pertaining to:
 The specific current actions and reasonable likely future uses of the site,
 The selection of remediation and an appropriate institutional control that allow or forbid activities,
 And associated continuing responsibilities.
Other risk and liability issues associated with brownfield redevelopment include:
 Public perception of redeveloped brownfield property
 Potential risks to receptors (e.g., types and concentrations of chemicals of concern)
 Potential exposure pathways (e.g., terrestrial surface radiation, inhalation, ingestion, dermal)
 Potential risks to human and ecological receptors (e.g., office workers, construction workers, residents, endangered species)

Regulation
Federal and state legislation pertinent to U.S. Brownfield policy is numerous and diverse. The most important include the Resource Conservation and Recovery Act (RCRA), the Community Reinvestment Act (CRA), (CERCLA Superfund), and the Small Business Liability and Brownfields Revitalization Act.

Federal level

Resource Conservation and Recovery Act (RCRA)
The Resource Conservation and Recovery Act was passed in 1976 and is the federal government's approach to the regulation of hazardous waste under a “cradle to the grave” scheme. It is important to Brownfields because at birth, RCRA applied only to active hazardous waste sites. It included no remedial or retroactive measures for regulating hazardous releases occurring before its passage. This deficiency helped lead to the passage of the Superfund legislation in 1980.

Community Reinvestment Act (CRA)
The Community Reinvestment Act was passed in 1977. Legislative intent behind the CRA was to incentivize the redevelopment of Brownfield properties. The Act was intended to force lenders to provide capital to the low and middle-income borrowers who lived proximally to Brownfield properties. The idea was that urban inhabitants would borrow money and invest in their neighborhoods, the development of which would require the remediation of the local Brownfields. However instead of investing in urban neighborhoods, many borrowers took the easy money and instead invested in “Greenfields,” or suburban and rural properties with fewer developmental risks. Essentially, an unintended side effect of the Act was the perpetuation of urban sprawl.

Comprehensive Environmental Response, Compensation and Liability Act (CERCLA) or Superfund
Superfund was passed in 1980 and among other things, granted EPA the authority to regulate cleanup of Superfund and Brownfield sites. Importantly, CERCLA does not preempt state clean-up laws and when passed, it did not distinguish between small and large generators of hazardous waste. In order to remediate a site, a party must comply with both state and EPA guidelines. There is no guarantee that compliance with state requirements will prevent further EPA regulation in the future. This complex liability scheme is a major disincentive faced by developers who under other circumstances, might be inclined to invest in remediating Brownfields.

Small Business Liability and Brownfields Revitalization Act6
The Small Business Liability and Brownfields Revitalization Act was passed in 2002 and amended CERCLA to limit the liability faced by developers, especially small developers. It lists a number of exceptions to Superfund liability but only to Brownfield sites.

Exemptions from Superfund liability
Bona Fide Prospective Purchasers – A release from liability of prospective purchasers even if they knew about the existence of contamination, but all contamination took place prior to purchase.
Contiguous Landowner Defense - If a landowner's property happens to abut a Brownfield site and they can prove by a preponderance of the evidence that they were not aware of any release of hazardous material, and did not consent to its release, then they qualify for an exemption.
Innocent Landowner Defense – If for instance, a landowner happened to lease their property to a polluter and can prove by a preponderance of the fact of not being not aware of any release of hazardous material and did not consent to its release, the landowner qualify for an exemption.

Windfall profit lien provision
If EPA incurs costs in cleaning up a site, and that site is subsequently sold for a profit, this exception allows EPA to impose a lien on the profits of the sale to recoup their costs of remediation.

De micromis exemption
Attempt by the Act to distinguish between small and large generators of waste. It defines a small generator of waste according to a series of limits, that if met qualify the generator for exemption. These limits are:
Contribution of less than 100 gallons of liquid waste
Contribution of less than 200 pounds of solid waste
Employment of less than 100 people

Increase of funds for redevelopment of brownfield sites
Increased the amount of federal funds available for brownfield redevelopment from $98 million to $200 million. Expired in 2006.

Federal enforcement deferral
An assurance by EPA that if state cleanup regulations are followed, that it will not require further remediation activities in the future. However, EPA reserves the right to require further cleanup if contamination crosses state lines, if new information on a site comes to light, or if it judges that a release presents an imminent and substantial danger.

State level
As a general rule, most state regulatory schemes resemble CERCLA in structure, though suffice to say, there is not one "cut and dry" state approach to regulating brownfields. Most important is that CERCLA does not preempt state regulation. In an attempt to limit developer liability, states have come up with various methods to try to limit the risk of the EPA requiring cleanup on top of what they require themselves. A Voluntary Cleanup Plan (VCP) is an agreement between a developer and a state that once a site has been remediated according to state regulations, that the state will not require cleanup in the future. The EPA uses a similar tool called a State Memorandum of Agreement (SMOA), which is an agreement between a developer and the EPA that EPA will not take future remediation action once compliance with the state VCP has been achieved.

See also
 American Recovery and Reinvestment Act of 2009
 Brownfield Land
 Brownfield status
 Hazardous Waste
 National Environmental Policy Act

References

External links
EPA Brownfields Home Page
Small Business Liability Relief and Brownfields Revitalization Act
Summary of the Resource Conservation and Recovery Act
Summary of the Superfund Act

Town and country planning in the United Kingdom